The Leco People are an ethnic group in Bolivia that live around Lake Titicaca. They numbered 13,527 in 2012 of which 189 spoke the Leco language natively.

References

Ethnic groups in Bolivia